Maharaja Ajasath is a 2015 Sri Lankan Sinhala epic biographical film directed by Sanath Abeysekara and produced by Sunil T. Fernando for Sunil T. Films. It stars Jeevan Kumaratunga, Gayan Wikramathilake, and Palitha Silva in lead roles along with Sabeetha Perera and Hashini Gonagala. Music co-composed by Rohana Weerasinghe and Ranga Dassanayaka. A special screening was taken place prior to original screening at Tharangani Cinema Hall, at National Film Corporation of Sri Lanka for Buddhist Monks.

The film reveals the story of King Ajasath, who lived in Magadha Empire, North India during the period of Buddha. The film shows how he who caused the death of his father to achieve the throne later seek refuge in Dharma.

Plot

Cast
 Jeevan Kumaratunga as King Bimbisara
 Sabeetha Perera as Kosala Devi
 Gayan Wikramathilake as Maharaja Ajasath
 Palitha Silva as Rev. Devadatta Thero
 Nadeeka Gunasekara as Kakawalli
 Hashini Gonagala as Princess Vajira
 Robin Fernando as Purohitha
 Rex Kodippili as Purohitha
 Roshan Ranawana as Sonu
 Cletus Mendis as Purohitha
 Wasantha Kumaravila as Maha Senavi
 G.R Perera as Mahamathya
 Menaka Maduwanthi as Badirawathi
 Geetha Kanthi Jayakody as Punna
 Gnananga Gunawardena
 Manel Chandralatha as Servant
 Lucien Bulathsinhala as Acharya, Who name make Ajasaththa

Soundtrack

References

External links
වැරැදි නොකරන මිනිසෙක් ලොවේ නැත
තමන්ට ගැළපෙන්නේ නැති අය ඇසුරු කරන්න එපා අජාසත් කියන්නේ එයයි

2015 films
2010s Sinhala-language films